Paolo Napoleon James Banchero (born November 12, 2002) is an American-Italian professional basketball player for the Orlando Magic of the National Basketball Association (NBA). He played college basketball for the Duke Blue Devils. Banchero was named the Rookie of the Year of the Atlantic Coast Conference (ACC) in 2022. Following his freshman season, he declared for the 2022 NBA draft, where he was selected with the first overall pick by the Orlando Magic.

Early life
In his childhood, he played basketball and American football and took part in track. He grew up playing basketball at Rotary Boys and Girls Club of Seattle, as well as EBC Camps most notably the Ballislife Jr. All-American Camp, drawing inspiration from his mother, who played professionally. He was ranked among the top 50 eighth-graders nationally in both basketball and football.

High school career

In his first year at O'Dea High School in Seattle, Banchero played football, as the backup quarterback on the state championship team, as well as basketball. As a freshman on the basketball team, he averaged 14.1 points and 10.2 rebounds per game. In his sophomore season, Banchero averaged 18.2 points, 10.3 rebounds and 4.3 assists per game, leading O'Dea to the Class 3A state championship, where he was named most valuable player. As a junior, he averaged 22.6 points, 11 rebounds, 3.7 assists and 1.6 blocks per game for the Class 3A runners-up, earning Washington Gatorade Player of the Year and MaxPreps National Junior of the Year honors. Banchero was named to the McDonald's All-American Game and Jordan Brand Classic rosters.

Recruiting
Banchero was a consensus five-star recruit and one of the top players in the 2021 class. Although he received offers from top NCAA Division I programs, including Duke and Kentucky, most recruiting analysts predicted that he would commit to Washington. Despite the predictions, on August 20, 2020, Banchero committed to playing college basketball for Duke.

College career
In his college debut, a 79–71 win against Kentucky, Banchero scored 22 points. On November 15, Banchero earned his first Atlantic Coast Conference (ACC) Freshman of the Week honor. On November 23, 2021, Banchero scored 28 points and 8 rebounds in a 107–81 victory against the Citadel. He was named first-team All-ACC as well as ACC Rookie of the Year. On March 15, 2022, Banchero was named a Third Team All-American. During the 2022 NCAA tournament, Banchero performed well, including scoring 22 points against Texas Tech. As a freshman, he averaged 17.2 points, 7.8 rebounds and 3.2 assists per game. On April 20, 2022, Banchero declared for the 2022 NBA draft, forgoing his remaining college eligibility.

Professional career

Orlando Magic (2022–present) 
Banchero was selected with the first overall pick by the Orlando Magic in the 2022 NBA draft. He made his summer league debut on July 7 against the Houston Rockets with 17 points, four rebounds, and six assists in a 91–77 win. On October 3, 2022, Banchero made his preseason debut, putting up eight points, two rebounds, and one assist in a 109–97 loss to the Memphis Grizzlies. On October 19, Banchero made his regular season debut, putting up 27 points, nine rebounds, five assists, and two blocks in a 113–109 loss to the Detroit Pistons. Banchero also became the first player since LeBron James to put up at least 25 points, five rebounds, and five assists in an NBA debut. On November 5, Banchero put up 33 points and 16 rebounds in a 126–123 loss to the Sacramento Kings. He also became the second teenager in NBA history to put up at least 30 points and 15 rebounds in a game, joining LeBron James.

National team career
Banchero is eligible to play for the Italy national basketball team and has indicated his willingness to represent Italy in international competitions. He was selected to the country's 24-man squad for the EuroBasket 2022 qualification games in November 2020; however, he did not play.

Career statistics

College

|-
| style="text-align:left;"| 2021–22
| style="text-align:left;"| Duke
| 39 || 39 || 33.0 || .478 || .338 || .729 || 7.8 || 3.2 || 1.1 || .9 || 17.2

Personal life
Banchero's mother, Rhonda (née Smith), played college basketball for Washington, leaving as the program's all-time scoring leader. She was a third-round selection in the 2000 WNBA draft and played professionally in the American Basketball League and overseas, before becoming a basketball coach at Holy Names Academy in Seattle. Banchero's father, Mario, and his uncle played college football for Washington. His parents met while attending the University of Washington. 

Banchero is of African-American descent on his mother’s side and of Italian descent on his father's side. In February 2020, he received Italian citizenship because of his paternal ancestry.

Banchero's paternal cousin, Chris Banchero, is also a professional basketball player in the Philippine Basketball Association, playing for the Meralco Bolts. They both won championships at O'Dea High School.

On the morning of November 14, 2021, Banchero was charged with aiding and abetting DUI after Duke teammate Michael Savarino, grandson of coach Mike Krzyzewski, was arrested on DUI charges. He is due to appear in court at a later date.

On May 8th, 2022, Banchero attended the inaugural Miami Grand Prix in Miami Gardens where he was mistakenly interviewed by Sky Sports legend Martin Brundle believing he was Patrick Mahomes.  The gaffe was caught on live television.

References

External links
Duke Blue Devils bio
USA Basketball bio

2002 births
Living people
African-American basketball players
All-American college men's basketball players
American men's basketball players
American people of Italian descent
Basketball players from Seattle
Duke Blue Devils men's basketball players
Italian men's basketball players
Italian people of African-American descent
McDonald's High School All-Americans
Orlando Magic draft picks
Orlando Magic players
Power forwards (basketball)